Frederick Miles (December 19, 1815 – November 20, 1896) was a Republican member of the United States House of Representatives from Connecticut's 4th congressional district from 1879 to 1883 and from 1889 to 1891. He had previously served in the Connecticut Senate from 1877 to 1879.

Early life 
He was born in Goshen, Connecticut, where he attended the common schools and pursued an academic course. He engaged in mercantile pursuits in Goshen until 1857 before moving to Twin Lakes, Connecticut, and later, in 1858, to Salisbury, Connecticut, and engaged in the manufacture of iron.

Political career 

Miles was a member of the Connecticut Senate from 1877 until February 1879, when he resigned. He was elected to the Forty-sixth and Forty-seventh Congresses (March 4, 1879 – March 3, 1883) but he declined a nomination for reelection. Miles was again elected to the Fifty-first Congress (March 4, 1889 – March 3, 1891) but was an unsuccessful candidate for reelection in 1890 to the Fifty-second Congress.

Later life and death 
After leaving Congress, he resumed business activities and died near Salisbury, Connecticut in 1896. He was buried in Salisbury Cemetery.

References

External links 

1815 births
1896 deaths
Republican Party Connecticut state senators
People from Goshen, Connecticut
Republican Party members of the United States House of Representatives from Connecticut
19th-century American politicians